The Ngee Ann Cultural Centre was set up in 1998 in the Teochew Building in Singapore. It is owned by the Ngee Ann Kongsi and aims to promote Singaporean awareness of Chinese culture, in particular Teochew heritage, through the medium of visual and performing arts. The Cultural Centre encourages involvement and engagement among the Singaporean Teochew community and its artists through Chinese calligraphy and brush painting as well as Teochew opera, dance, music, and drama. The Cultural Centre also supports artists and performers by offering exhibition space, facilities, and organisational resources for local and international artistic and cultural activities.

The Centre organises three annual exhibitions: The National Teochew Art and Chinese Calligraphy Exhibition, the Ngee Ann Photographic Exhibition, and the 3D Art Exhibition. The National Teochew Art and Chinese Calligraphy Exhibition occurs on November 19 every year, showcasing amateur and professional artists of Teochew ancestry. The exhibition spans hundreds of contemporary and traditional artworks in diverse media such as Chinese brush painting, calligraphy, watercolours, oils, acrylic and mixed media artwork. It also includes a section showcasing talent from primary and secondary schools. Each year one outstanding artist is selected from the exhibitors and honoured by having their artwork highlighted on the cover of the accompanying souvenir magazine.

In accordance with its interest in spiritual well-being, the Cultural Centre hosts many Dharma and Buddhist spiritual talks and initiations by Tibetan and Chinese religious teachers. Inter-religious organisations have also held talks at the Centre.

Apart from a spacious exhibition hall and an auditorium, the Centre also contains two smaller function rooms.

The current 39th Chairman of the NACC is Ang Hoon Seng, supported by Vice-chairman Phua Bah Lee.

References 

1998 establishments in Singapore
Cultural centers